Safwan Abdul-Ghani Mohammed (born September 9, 1983 in Iraq) is a former Iraqi football player who last played for Najaf in Iraq.

Honours

Country 
 2005 West Asian Games Gold medallist.

External links
 
 

1983 births
Living people
Iraqi footballers
Iraq international footballers
Iraqi expatriate footballers
Al-Quwa Al-Jawiya players
Al-Shorta SC players
Association football midfielders